General Winder may refer to:

Charles Sidney Winder (1829–1862), Confederate States Army brigadier general
John H. Winder (1800–1865), Confederate States Army brigadier general
Levin Winder (1757–1819), Maryland Militia brigadier general
William H. Winder (1775–1824), U.S. Army brigadier general

See also
General Winter (disambiguation)